The 2020 National Hockey League All-Star Game was held on January 25, 2020, at the Enterprise Center in St. Louis, Missouri, the home of the St. Louis Blues. The city previously hosted the NHL All-Star Game in 1970 and 1988 at the former St. Louis Arena. For the fifth year, the All-Star Game used a 3-on-3 format, with teams representing each of the league's four divisions competing in a single-elimination tournament.

The Pacific All-Stars won the All-Star Game after defeating the Atlantic All-Stars in the final, 5–4. David Pastrnak of the Boston Bruins, representing the Atlantic, was named the Most Valuable Player after recording a total of four goals and two assists over the course of both the Atlantic's 9–5 semifinal win over the Metropolitan team and their loss in the final to the Pacific team.

Skills Competition

The NHL All-Star Skills Competition was held on the night before on January 24. The Fastest Skater, Save Streak, Accuracy Shooting, and Hardest Shot events made their return. A new event, the Shooting Stars, also made its debut, featuring players shooting pucks from an elevated  platform behind the goal towards targets on the ice.

The winners of the five skills events were:
 Fastest Skater: Mathew Barzal, New York Islanders
 Save Streak: Jordan Binnington, St. Louis Blues
 Accuracy Shooting: Jaccob Slavin, Carolina Hurricanes
 Hardest Shot: Shea Weber, Montreal Canadiens
 Shooting Stars: Patrick Kane, Chicago Blackhawks

Elite Women's 3-on-3 game

An Elite Women's 3-on-3 game also took place on the night of the Skills Competition, featuring American and Canadian women's all-stars. The game was two 10-minute periods, with a running clock.

The Canadians won, 2–1, off of goals by Rebecca Johnston and Melodie Daoust. Hilary Knight had the lone goal for the Americans. Ann-Renee Desbiens made 15 saves in the win, while Alex Rigsby Cavallini made 14 saves in the loss.

American All-Stars
 Forwards: Kendall Coyne Schofield, Brianna Decker, Amanda Kessel, Hilary Knight, Jocelyne Lamoureux-Davidson, Annie Pankowski, and Alexandra Carpenter
 Defense: Kacey Bellamy and Lee Stecklein
 Goalie: Alex Rigsby Cavallini 
 Head coach: Cammi Granato

Canadian All-Stars
 Forwards: Meghan Agosta, Melodie Daoust, Rebecca Johnston, Sarah Nurse, Marie-Philip Poulin, Natalie Spooner, and Blayre Turnbull
 Defense: Renata Fast and Laura Fortino
 Goalie: Ann-Renee Desbiens
 Head coach: Jayna Hefford

Rosters
As in the previous four All-Star Games, captaincy of each division was determined by a fan vote, with the 2020 vote running from November 30 to December 20, 2019. On December 21, the four captains were announced by the NHL. Connor McDavid of the Edmonton Oilers was selected to captain the Pacific Division for the fourth straight year. Nathan MacKinnon of the Colorado Avalanche was selected for the Central Division for the second straight year (MacKinnon was selected but did not play in the 2019 game). First time captain David Pastrnak of the Boston Bruins was picked for the Atlantic Division. Alexander Ovechkin of the Washington Capitals was selected for the Metropolitan Division for the third straight year, but for the second consecutive year he has opted to abstain from the game to rest. Most of the rest of the rosters were announced on December 30. Fans were further invited from January 1 to January 10, 2020 to vote for an additional "Last Man In" player for each division. The "Last Men In" elected were Mitch Marner of the Toronto Maple Leafs (Atlantic), T. J. Oshie of the Washington Capitals (Metropolitan), David Perron of the St. Louis Blues (Central), and Quinn Hughes of the Vancouver Canucks (Pacific).

On January 3, the head coaches were announced, chosen from the team in each division with the highest points percentage through January 2, roughly the regular season's halfway point: Bruce Cassidy of the Boston Bruins (Atlantic), Todd Reirden of the Washington Capitals (Metropolitan), Craig Berube of the St. Louis Blues (Central), and Gerard Gallant of Vegas Golden Knights (Pacific). Since then, the Golden Knights fired Gallant on January 15 following the team's under-performance; the league announced one day later that his replacement in the all-star game would be Rick Tocchet of the Arizona Coyotes, who were first in Pacific on that day.

Honorary captains were also named for each of the four divisions: Actors and St. Louis natives Jon Hamm (Metropolitan) and Jenna Fischer (Atlantic), and former Blues players Brett Hull (Central) and Wayne Gretzky (Pacific).

Referees named to work the All-Star Game were Francois St-Laurent and Justin St. Pierre, and linesman Michel Cormier and Bryan Pancich.

The Anaheim Ducks were not represented by anyone due to Jakob Silfverberg, the Ducks' selection for the game, being excused for the birth of his child.

Eastern Conference

~ Voted "Last Man In".
† Replaced Auston Matthews (Toronto Maple Leafs) due to injury (still attended All-Star weekend).
‡ Replaced Tuukka Rask (Boston Bruins), who opted to abstain from the game to rest.

Alexander Ovechkin (C) (Washington Capitals) opted to abstain from the game to rest.
~ Voted "Last Man In".
† Replaced Jake Guentzel (Pittsburgh Penguins) due to injury.
‡ Replaced Kyle Palmieri (New Jersey Devils) due to injury.
* Replaced Artemi Panarin (New York Rangers) due to injury.
^ Replaced Dougie Hamilton (Carolina Hurricanes) due to injury.
# Replaced Joonas Korpisalo (Columbus Blue Jackets) due to injury.

Western Conference

~ Voted "Last Man In".

~ Voted "Last Man In".
† Replaced Logan Couture (San Jose Sharks) due to injury.
‡ Replaced Jakob Silfverberg (Anaheim Ducks), who was excused from the game due to the birth of his child.
* Replaced Marc-Andre Fleury (Vegas Golden Knights), who opted to abstain from the game to rest.
^ Replaced Darcy Kuemper (Arizona Coyotes) due to injury.
¤ Replaced Gerard Gallant, who was fired from the Vegas Golden Knights.

Bracket

Game summaries

First semifinal game

Second semifinal game

Final

Uniforms
The All-Star uniforms were unveiled on January 8. Like the previous season, each player's respective team logo is featured on the front, but this time they are only rendered in one team color (e.g. the Boston Bruins logo is only rendered in gold instead of black and gold). The striping patterns also added to the front and sleeves to the uniforms are meant to resemble a musical staff to honor the music of St. Louis.

Festivities and entertainment
This year's NHL Fan Fair, featuring various fan activities during All-Star Weekend, was held between Thursday, January 23 and Sunday, January 26 at Union Station.

The rock band O.A.R. performed during a concert outside the Enterprise Center prior to the All-Star Skills Competition. The rock band Green Day also gave an outdoor concert prior to the All-Star Game and then performed during the second intermission.

Awolnation performed during the player introductions before the game. Canadian country music singer Tenille Townes sang the Canadian national anthem while retired St. Louis Blues anthem singer Charles Glenn sang the U.S. national anthem.

Television
The All-Star Game and Skills Competition was broadcast in the United States by NBC and NBCSN, respectively. In Canada, both the All-Star Game and skills competition was broadcast in English on both CBC and Sportsnet (under the Hockey Night in Canada banner), and on TVA Sports in French. With the 2021 game being canceled due to the COVID-19 pandemic, which would force the NHL to suspend the remainder of the season, this was the last All-Star Game to air on NBC.

As with the 2019 All-Star Game, the league continued testing its new player and puck tracking systems.  The league had planned to deploy this technology to all 31 NHL arenas prior to the start of the season, but a change to its primary technology partner has delayed full league-wide implementation until the playoffs.

The league also experimented with its "digitally enhanced dasherboards", first used at the 2016 World Cup of Hockey, for the digital replacement of advertising on the rink boards on selected camera shots. Nine localized feeds were available (expanded from four during the World Cup), including Canada English, Canada French, the United States, as well as the Czech Republic and Slovakia, Finland, Russia, Sweden, Switzerland, and world feeds. The goal is to eventually deploy this technology for all NHL telecasts, for the benefit of its national and regional broadcasters.

References

National Hockey League All-Star Games
All
National Hockey League All-Star Game
2020 in sports in Missouri
Ice hockey competitions in St. Louis